Placenta cake is a dish from ancient Greece and Rome consisting of many dough layers interspersed with a mixture of cheese and honey and flavored with bay leaves, baked and then covered in honey. The dessert is mentioned in classical texts such as the Greek poems of Archestratos and Antiphanes, as well as the De agri cultura of Cato the Elder.

Etymology
The Latin word placenta is derived from the Greek plakous ( – plakountos, from πλακόεις – plakoeis, "flat") for thin or layered flat breads. 

The placenta of mammalian pregnancy is so named from the perceived resemblance between its shape and that of a placenta cake.

History 
An early Greek language mention of  plakous as a dessert (or second table delicacy) comes from the poems of Archestratos. He describes plakous as served with nuts and dried fruits and commends the honey-drenched Athenian version of plakous. 

Antiphanes (fl. 4th century BC), a contemporary of Archestratos, provided an ornate description of plakous with wheat flour and goat's cheese as key ingredients:

The streams of the tawny bee, mixed with the curdled river of bleating she-goats, placed upon a flat receptacle of the virgin daughter of Demeter [honey, cheese, flour], delighting in ten thousand delicate toppings – or shall I simply say plakous? I'm for plakous' (Antiphanes quoted by Athenaeus).

Later, in 160 BC, Cato the Elder provided a recipe for placenta in his De agri cultura which Andrew Dalby considers, along with Cato's other dessert recipes, to be in the "Greek tradition", and possibly copied from a Greek cookbook.

Shape the placenta as follows: place a single row of tracta along the whole length of the base dough. This is then covered with the mixture [cheese and honey] from the mortar. Place another row of tracta on top and go on doing so until all the cheese and honey have been used up. Finish with a layer of tracta...place the placenta in the oven and put a preheated lid on top of it [...] When ready, honey is poured over the placenta. (Cato the Elder, De Agri Cultura)

A number of modern scholars suggest that the Greco-Roman dessert's Eastern Roman (Byzantine) descendants, plakountas tetyromenous ("cheesy placenta") and koptoplakous (Byzantine Greek: κοπτοπλακοῦς), are the ancestors of modern tiropita or banitsa) respectively. The name placenta is used today on the island of Lesbos in Greece to describe a baklava-type dessert of layered pastry leaves containing crushed nuts that is baked and then covered in honey. Through its Byzantine Greek name plakountos, the dessert was adopted into Armenian cuisine as plagindi, plagunda, and pghagund, all "cakes of bread and honey." From the latter term came the later Arabic name iflaghun, which is mentioned in the medieval Arab cookbook Wusla ila al-habib as a specialty of the Cilician Armenians settled in southern Asia Minor and settled in the neighboring Crusader kingdoms of northern Syria. Thus, the dish may have traveled to the Levant in the Middle Ages via the Armenians, many of whom migrated there following the first appearance of the Turkish tribes in medieval Anatolia.

Legacy

Today, derivatives of the Latin word  are still used throughout the Balkans: in Romania (plăcintă, a baked flat pastry containing cheese), in Serbia (Palačinke, a very thinly made crepe-like pancake usually rolled with sugar and jam between the layers or served with nuts and dried fruits and commends the honey), and on the island of Lesbos in Greece. The latter is a baked dessert with very thinly made pastry layers and chopped nuts. The dough for this modern  is made with thin leaves of crumbly pastry dough soaked in simple syrup. Ouzo is added to the dough.

See also

List of breads
List of pastries

References

Citations

Sources

External links

Ancient dishes
Byzantine cuisine
Ancient Greek cuisine
Greek cuisine
Historical foods
Roman cuisine

la:Placenta (libum)#Ferculum Romanorum